Mordechai Schwarcz (December 16, 1914 - August 16, 1938) was a Czechoslovakia-born Jewish police officer in Mandatory Palestine, who was executed for the murder of a fellow Arab police officer. The background to the incident was the 1936–1939 Arab revolt in Palestine and the debate in the Yishuv regarding the proper reaction and in particular the policy of Havlagah, or restraint taken by the Haganah.

Biography
Schwarcz was born in Komárno, then in the Austro-Hungarian Empire, to a Jewish family, one of 14 children. He made aliyah in 1933. He joined the Palestine Police Force, and like most Jewish police officers, also joined the Haganah.

Schwarcz was one of the policemen stationed at the High Commissioner's summer camp in Atlit to guard against bandits. On the night of September 1, 1937, he shot dead Mustafa Khoury, an Arab policeman with whom he shared a tent. He was arrested a week after Khoury was found dead. At his trial, he claimed that he had heard gunfire and rushed outside the tent, only to find Khoury dead upon returning. The court rejected his testimony. One of Schwarcz's friends testified that Khoury had entered drunk, boasting about having raped and murdered Jews, and telling Schwarcz his time would come. Schwarcz was convicted of murder and sentenced to death by a Haifa court. The Palestine Supreme Court approved the sentence, the Privy Council in London refused to look at the case, and the High Commissioner confirmed the sentence. Appeals for clemency came from American and international Jewish organizations, a petition with 70,000 signatures, and Moshe Sharett, the director of the Jewish Agency's Political Department, wrote a letter to High Commissioner Harold MacMichael requesting a pardon, but to no avail.

Schwarcz was hanged in Acre Prison on August 16, 1938 after receiving last rites from Rabbi Yehoshua Kaniel of Haifa. Ten days before his execution, he personally confessed to the murder to Rabbi Kaniel. He also penned a confession expressing repentance, writing that he had killed Khoury while "temporarily insane". He declared "I am ready to die for an act for which I alone am responsible", told friends and journalists that he was dying for a "private mistake", and asked that he not be made into a martyr by the Yishuv and Jewish diaspora.

Aftermath
The Haganah disowned Schwarcz over his actions, and refused to acknowledge him as a casualty from its ranks. Throughout the following decades, only a handful of journalists and researchers wrote about him. In contrast to the other Olei Hagardom, he was largely forgotten. However, when Menachem Begin became Prime Minister of Israel, he added Schwarcz to the official list of Olei Hagardom. In 1987, after repeated appeals from Schwarcz's fiancée, the Haganah veterans' organization finally agreed to have his picture displayed in the museum exhibit for Olei Hagardom, with a note that he was from the Haganah.

Several journalists have investigated his case and the political struggle that took place over his acceptance as a national martyr. On March 8, 2010, an article by journalist Yossi Melman in Haaretz entitled "The Battle Over the Memorialization of the Forgotten Hanged Man" reported on the attempt by veterans of the Lehi and Irgun groups to have him acknowledged as someone who had acted out of a nationalist motive and had contributed to the foundation of the State of Israel and the opposition by veterans of the Haganah.

References

Jews in Mandatory Palestine
Czechoslovak emigrants to Mandatory Palestine
People executed by Mandatory Palestine by hanging
1938 deaths
1914 births